Nahur is a railway station on the Central line of the Mumbai Suburban Railway network. 

Nahur has also helped in reducing the congestion in these stations, especially during the peak hours. Only slow trains halt at Nahur, as it currently doesn't have the provisions (or the need) to introduce platforms for fast trains. Nahur station was officially inaugurated on 21 April 2006.

Nahur station has been a catalyst in Bhandup's development, catering to the needs of those living in Bhandup East, as well as those near the Airoli Link road.
This is also the nearest railway station on the Central Railway connecting to Airoli in New Mumbai.
It can also be approached from Bhandup Station from either side. East and West of Nahur station are connected though the Mulund-Goregaon Link Road.

References 

Railway stations in Mumbai Suburban district
Railway stations opened in 2006
Mumbai Suburban Railway stations
Mumbai CR railway division